Since the advent of genetic engineering in the 1970s, concerns have been raised about the dangers of the technology.  Laws, regulations, and treaties were created in the years following to contain genetically modified organisms and prevent their escape.  Nevertheless, there are several examples of failure to keep GM crops separate from conventional ones.

Overview 
In the context of agriculture and food and feed production, co-existence means using cropping systems with and without genetically modified crops in parallel. In some countries, such as the United States, co-existence is not governed by any single law but instead is managed by regulatory agencies and tort law.  In other regions, such as Europe, regulations require that the separation and the identity of the respective food and feed products must be maintained at all stages of the production process.

Many consumers are critical of genetically modified plants and their products, while, conversely, most experts in charge of GMO approvals do not perceive concrete threats to health or the environment. The compromise chosen by some countries  - notably the European Union - has been to implement regulations specifically governing co-existence and traceability. Traceability has become commonplace in the food and feed supply chains of most countries in the world, but the traceability of GMOs is made more challenging by the addition of very strict legal thresholds for unwanted mixing.  Within the European Union, since 2001, conventional and organic food and feedstuffs can contain up to 0.9% of authorised GM material without being labelled GM  (any trace of non-authorised GM products would cause shipments to be rejected).

In the United States there is no legislation governing the co-existence of neighboring farms growing organic and GM crops; instead the US relies on a "complex but relaxed" combination of three federal agencies (FDA, EPA, and USDA/APHIS) and the common law tort system, governed by state law, to manage risks of co-existence.

Containment measures
To limit mixing in the first stages of production, researchers and politicians are developing codes of good agricultural practice for GM crops. In addition to the thorough cleaning of machinery, recommended measures include the establishment of "isolation distances" and "pollen barriers". Isolation distances are the minimum distances required between GM and non-GM cultivations for most of the GM pollen to fall to the ground before reaching non-GM plants. Pollen barriers attempt actively catch pollen, and can consist of hedges and trees which physically hinder pollen movement. Pollen barriers consisting of conventional crops of the same species as the GM crop have a special advantage, as the conventional plants not only physically limit the GM pollen flow, but also produce competitive, conventional pollen. During harvest, the buffer strip of conventional crops is considered part of the GM crop yield.

Biological approaches
In addition to agricultural measures, there may be also biological tools to prevent the genetically modified crop from fertilising conventional fields. Researchers are investigating methods either to prevent GM crops from producing pollen at all (for example male-sterile plants), or to develop GM crops with pollen that nonetheless does not contain the additional, genetically engineered material. In an example of the latter, transplastomic plants can be generated in which the genetic modification has been integrated in the DNA of chloroplasts. As the chloroplasts of plants are maternally inherited, the transgenes are not spread by pollen thus achieving biological containment.  In other words, the cell nucleus contains no transgenes, and the pollen contains no chloroplasts and thus no transgenes. Two important research projects on co-existence are and Co-Extra. With the end of the de facto moratorium on genetically modified plants in Europe, several research programmes (e.g. SIGMEA, Co-Extra, and Transcontainer) have begun investigating biological containment strategies for GMOs.

While SIGMEA was focused on co-existence at the farm level, Co-Extra studies co-existence along the whole production chain, and has a second focus on the traceability of GMOs, since co-existence cannot work without traceability. To be able to monitor and enforce compliance with co-existence regulations, authorities require the ability to trace, detect and identify GMOs.

Regulation and policy 

The development of a regulatory framework concerning genetic engineering began in 1975, at Asilomar, California. The first use of Recombinant DNA (rDNA) technology had just been successfully accomplished by Stanley Cohen and Herbert Boyer two years previously and the scientific community recognized that as well as benefits this technology could also pose some risks. The Asilomar meeting recommended a set of guidelines regarding the cautious use of recombinant technology and any products resulting from that technology. The Asilomar recommendations were voluntary, but in 1976 the US National Institute of Health (NIH) formed a rDNA advisory committee. This was followed by other regulatory offices (the United States Department of Agriculture (USDA), Environmental Protection Agency (EPA) and Food and Drug Administration (FDA)), effectively making all rDNA research tightly regulated in the USA.

In 1982 the Organisation for Economic Co-operation and Development (OECD) released a report into the potential hazards of releasing genetically modified organisms into the environment as the first transgenic plants were being developed. As the technology improved and genetically organisms moved from model organisms to potential commercial products the USA established a committee at the Office of Science and Technology (OSTP) to develop mechanisms to regulate the developing technology. In 1986 the OSTP assigned regulatory approval of genetically modified plants in the US to the USDA, FDA and EPA.

The Cartagena Protocol on Biosafety was adopted on 29 January 2000 and entered into force on 11 September 2003. It is an international treaty that governs the transfer, handling, and use of genetically modified (GM) organisms. It is focussed on movement of GMOs between countries and has been called a de facto trade agreement. One hundred and fifty-seven countries are members of the Protocol and many use it as a reference point for their own regulations.

In the face of continuing concerns about the economic losses that might be suffered by organic farmers by unintended intermixing, the U.S. Secretary of Agriculture convened an Advisory Committee on Biotechnology and 21st Century Agriculture (AC21) to study the issue and make recommendations as to whether to address these concerns and if so, how. economic losses to farmers caused by unintended presence of genetically engineered materials, as well as how such mechanisms might work.  The members  of AC21 included representatives of the biotechnology industry, the organic food industry, farming communities, the seed industry, food manufacturers, State government, consumer and community development groups, the medical profession, and academic researchers.  The AC21 recommended that a study should be conducted to answer the question of whether and to what extent there are any economic losses to US organic farmers; recommended that if the losses are serious, that a crop insurance program for organic farmers be put in place, and that an education program should be undertaken to ensure that organic farmers are putting appropriate contracts in place for their crops and that neighboring GM crop farmers are taking appropriate containment measures. Overall the report supported a diverse agriculture system in which many different farming systems could co-exist.

Compensation for failure to maintain separation 
Since GM-free products yield higher prices in many countries, some governments have introduced limits for the mixing of both production systems, with compensation for non-GM farmers for economic losses in cases where mixing inadvertently occurred.  One tool for compensation is a liability fund, to which all GM farmers, and sometimes GM seed producers, contribute. After a notable GMO contamination event in Western Australia where a certified organic farm lost certification due to GMO contamination, a Parliamentary Inquiry considered six proactive proposals for compensating farms contaminated by GMOs, however the Inquiry did not recommend a particular mechanism of compensation.

Notable escapes
Mixing can occur already at the agricultural stage. Fundamentally, two reasons exist for the presence of GMOs in the harvest of a non-GM cultivation: first, that the seed has been contaminated already or, secondly, that the plants in the non-GM field have received pollen from neighbouring GM fields.  Mixing may also occur post-harvest, anywhere in the production chain.

1990s 
In 1997, Percy Schmeiser discovered that canola growing on his farm was genetically modified to be resistant to Roundup although he had not planted GM seed. He had initially discovered that some canola growing by a roadside along one of his fields was Roundup resistant when he was killing weeds along the road; this led him to spray a 3- to 4‑acre section of his adjacent field and 60% of the canola survived. Schmeiser harvested the seed from the surviving, Roundup resistant plants, and planted the seed in 1998. Monsanto sued Schmeiser for patent infringement for the 1998 planting. Schmeiser claimed that because the 1997 plants grew from seed that was blown into his field from neighboring fields, that he owned the harvest and was entitled to do with it whatever he wished, including saving the seeds from the 1997 harvest and planting them in 1998. The case (Monsanto Canada Inc v Schmeiser) went to the Supreme Court which held for Monsanto by a 5‑4 vote in late May 2004.  The case is widely cited or referenced by the anti-GM community in the context of a fear of a company claiming ownership of a farmer's crop based on the inadvertent presence of GM pollen grain or seed. "The court record shows, however, that it was not just a few seeds from a passing truck, but that Mr Schmeiser was growing a crop of 95–98% pure Roundup Ready plants, a commercial level of purity far higher than one would expect from inadvertent or accidental presence. The judge could not account for how a few wayward seeds or pollen grains could come to dominate hundreds of acres without Mr Schmeiser's active participation, saying '. . .none of the suggested sources could reasonably explain the concentration or extent of Roundup Ready canola of a commercial quality evident from the results of tests on Schmeiser's crop'" – in other words, the original presence of Monsanto seed on his land in 1997 was indeed inadvertent, but the crop in 1998 was entirely purposeful.

In 1999 scientists in Thailand claimed they discovered glyphosate-resistant genetically modified wheat that was not yet approved for release in a grain shipment from the Pacific Northwest of the United States, even though transgenic wheat had never been approved for sale and was only ever grown in test plots. No one could explain how the transgenic wheat got into the food supply.

2000s 
In 2000, Aventis StarLink corn, which had been approved only as animal feed due to concerns about possible allergic reactions in humans, was found contaminating corn products in U.S. supermarkets and restaurants. This corn became the subject of a widely publicized recall, when Taco Bell taco shells were found to contain the corn, eventually resulting in the recall of over 300 products. It was the first-ever recall of a genetically modified food.  The registration for the Starlink varieties was voluntarily withdrawn by Aventis in October 2000.

In 2005, scientists at the UK Centre for Ecology and Hydrology reported the first evidence of horizontal gene transfer of pesticide resistance to weeds, in a few plants from a single season;  they found no evidence that any of the hybrids had survived in subsequent seasons.

In 2006, American exports of rice to Europe were interrupted when the U.S. crop was contaminated with rice containing the LibertyLink modification, which had not been approved for release.  An investigation by the USDA's Animal and Plant Health Inspection Service (APHIS) was unable to determine the cause of the contamination.

In 2009 the government of Mexico created a regulatory pathway for approval of genetically modified maize, but because Mexico is the center of diversity for maize, concerns have been raised about the effect that genetically modified maize could have on local strains. A 2001 report in Nature presented evidence that Bt maize was cross-breeding with unmodified maize in Mexico, although the data in this paper was later described as originating from an artifact and Nature stated that "the evidence available is not sufficient to justify the publication of the original paper". A subsequent large-scale study, in 2005, failed to find any evidence of contamination in Oaxaca. However, other authors have stated that they also found evidence of cross-breeding between natural maize and transgenic maize.

2010s 
A study published in 2010 by scientists at the University of Arkansas, North Dakota State University, California State University and the US Environmental Protection Agency showed that about 83 percent of wild or weedy canola tested contained genetically modified herbicide resistance genes.  According to the researchers, the lack of reports in the US suggests inadequate oversight and monitoring protocols are in place in the US. The development of weeds resistant to glyphosate, the most commonly applied herbicide, could mean that farmers must return to more labour-intensive methods to control weeds, use more dangerous herbicides or till the soil (so increasing then risk of erosion). A 2010 report by the National Academy of Sciences stated that the advent of glyphosate-herbicide resistant weeds could cause the genetically engineered crops to lose their effectiveness unless farmers also use other established weed management strategies. In Australia, some of a 2010 planting of Monsanto's Roundup-Ready (RR) canola blew across a neighboring organic farm. The organic farm lost its organic certification and the organic farmer sued the GM farmer - so far without success. The certifier called it "contamination" and in the 2014 judgement the judge called it an "incursion" and rejected claims for nuisance, negligence and damages.

In 2013, glyphosate-resistant genetically modified wheat that was not yet approved for release, but which had been declared safe for consumption in the USA, was discovered in a farm in Oregon, growing as a weed or "volunteer plant". The wheat had been created by Monsanto, and was a strain that was field-tested from 1998 to 2005 and was in the American regulatory approval process before Monsanto withdrew it based on concern that importers would avoid the crop. The last field test in Oregon had occurred in 2001. Volunteer wheat from a field two miles away owned by the same farmer and planted with the same seed was tested and it was not found to be glyphosate-resistant. Monsanto was liable for fines of up to $1 million, if violations of the Plant Protection Act were found. According to Monsanto it was "mystified" by its appearance, having destroyed all the material it held after completing trials in 2004 and because they did not think that seed left in the ground or pollen transfer could account for it. Later in the month, Monsanto suggested that the presence of the wheat was likely an act of "sabotage". The discovery could have threatened U.S. wheat exports, which totaled $8.1 billion in 2012; the US is the world's largest wheat exporter. New Scientist reported that the variety of wheat was rarely imported into Europe and doubted that the discovery of the wheat would affect Europe, but more likely destined for Asia. As a result of the discovery of the unapproved strain, Japan and South Korea halted wheat orders from the United States, leaving wheat growers in neighboring communities unable to decide what to plant next season. The crop growing when the genetically modified wheat was discovered had already been sold or insured. On June 14, 2013, the USDA announced: "As of today, USDA has neither found nor been informed of anything that would indicate that this incident amounts to more than a single isolated incident in a single field on a single farm. All information collected so far shows no indication of the presence of GE wheat in commerce." As of August 30, while the source of the GM wheat remained unknown, Japan, South Korea and Taiwan had all resumed placing orders, and the export market resumed. The Oregon wheat commissioner, Blake Rowe, said that "the overall economic impact has been minimal".

References

External links
 Co-Extra – EU research programme on co-existence and traceability along the whole production chain
 SIGMEA – EU research programme on co-existence in agriculture
 Transcontainer – EU research programme on biological containment systems for genetically modified plants
 GMO-Compass – facts, numbers, and news about GM crops in Europe
 Research projects: Biological confinement of new genes - methods for containing the spread of genetically modified plants

Genetic engineering and agriculture
Genetically modified organisms
Genetic engineering
Biological techniques and tools
Regulation of genetically modified organisms
Biological contamination